Heureux Anniversaire (also known as Happy Anniversary) is a 1962 French short comedy film directed by Pierre Étaix. It won an Oscar in 1963 for Best Short Subject.

Cast
 Robert Blome
 Pierre Étaix
 Lucien Frégis
 Laurence Lignières
 Georges Loriot
 Ican Paillaud
 Nono Zammit

References

External links

1962 films
1962 comedy films
1962 short films
1960s French-language films
French comedy short films
French black-and-white films
Live Action Short Film Academy Award winners
Films directed by Pierre Étaix
Films with screenplays by Jean-Claude Carrière
1960s French films